Eric Emerson (June 23, 1945 – May 28, 1975) was an American musician, dancer, and actor. Emerson is best known for his roles in films by pop artist Andy Warhol, and as a member of the seminal glam punk group the Magic Tramps.

Career
Growing up in New Jersey, Emerson trained as a classic ballet dancer. It was this talent that caught the eye of artist and filmmaker Andy Warhol. After seeing Emerson dancing at The Dom in April 1966, Warhol asked Emerson to be in one of his underground films. Emerson made his film debut in 1967's Chelsea Girls, and soon became a Factory regular. Emerson starred in other Warhol films, most notably Lonesome Cowboys, San Diego Surf, and Heat. Heat would be Emerson's last film.

Emerson began his musical career with The Magic Tramps. The band, which began in Hollywood in 1969, relocated to New York City in 1971 after Emerson joined as lead vocalist. The Magic Tramps played under various names, including Messiah and Star Theater, and played gigs at Max's Kansas City, a favorite hangout among Factory regulars. They were one of the early bands to play at CBGB. Later that year, Emerson appeared in Jackie Curtis' play Vain Victory: Vicissitudes of the Damned, with Ondine, Holly Woodlawn, and Candy Darling, and music by the Magic Tramps and Lou Reed.

Album cover lawsuit
When the debut album of The Velvet Underground and Nico was first issued, the main back cover photo (taken at an Exploding Plastic Inevitable performance) featured an image of Emerson projected upside-down on the wall behind the band. Emerson threatened to sue over this unauthorized use of his image unless he was paid. Rather than complying, MGM recalled copies of the album and halted its distribution until Emerson's image could be airbrushed from the photo on subsequent pressings. Copies that had been printed were sold with a large black sticker covering the actor's image. The image was restored for the 1996 CD reissue.

Personal life
Emerson's bisexuality was well known within Warhol's circle and he had relationships with many of the Factory regulars. It was known at the Factory that Billy Smith, Warhol's social publicist, was very close to Emerson. When Emerson's father accused his son of being "a little sweet", Emerson responded by saying, "What he don't understand is that my generation can swing both ways". On July 21, 1969, Emerson agreed to marry Warhol superstar, Jackie Curtis. When Emerson failed to show up, Curtis married a wedding guest. The wedding, which was a publicity stunt arranged by Curtis, was covered by The Village Voice.

Emerson had three children from prior relationships. He had a daughter Erica in 1967, a son, Branch Emerson, with Stilettos singer Elda Gentile. In 1970, he and model and actress Jane Forth, who appeared in Warhol's Women in Revolt, L'Amour, Trash, and Bad, had a son named Emerson Forth. At the time of his death, Emerson was living with Barbara Winter, ex-wife of musician Edgar Winter.

Death
On May 28, 1975, Emerson's body was found next to his bicycle, near the West Side Highway in Manhattan. Emerson's death is listed officially as a hit and run. He was 29 years old. To date, no one has been arrested or charged in connection with his death. Following a weekend-long wake hosted by Max's Kansas City owner Mickey Ruskin, Emerson was buried in Wharton, New Jersey.

After Emerson's death, various reports surfaced that he was not killed in a hit and run accident, but overdosed on heroin in a different location, and was dumped as a staged hit and run. These reports have never been substantiated, and Emerson's official cause of death never has been changed.

In the book Making Tracks, Debbie Harry provided an account of the circumstances surrounding Emerson's death:

One night we were over at Eric's apartment working on a tape of "Heart of Glass" on his Teac four-track tape recorder, when he suddenly staggered out of the kitchen looking ashen. He looked even more distraught and sad when we left. Being satisfied drove him crazy in the end, because he had everything so he didn't care about anything anymore. He used to go out jogging every day, and did feats of physical endurance like strapping twenty-pound weights to each ankle and then bicycling up to the Factory. The next day we were sitting around the house just after we woke up when Barbara called with the bad news. "Oh, Eric got hit by a truck." He had been a good friend and inspiration to so many people. We didn't quite understand what had happened, but we went up to a party/wake held for him and saw a lot of people from the earlier glitter days. Eric's death definitely marked an end to the glitter period. We still miss him.

References

External links
 
 The Magic Tramps Official Site
 Interview With The Magic Tramps

Male actors from New Jersey
American male dancers
American male film actors
American male stage actors
Bisexual male actors
Bisexual musicians
American LGBT musicians
LGBT people from New Jersey
Musicians from New Jersey
Road incident deaths in New York City
1945 births
1975 deaths
Place of birth unknown
Male actors from New York City
20th-century American male actors
20th-century American musicians
LGBT dancers
People associated with The Factory
Cycling road incident deaths
American bisexual actors